Polar Studios was a recording studio in Stockholm, Sweden, which operated from 1978 through 2004. The studio was formed by ABBA musicians Björn Ulvaeus and Benny Andersson and the band's manager Stig Anderson, owner of the Polar Music recording label.

The studio was used to record each of the last three ABBA albums, Voulez-Vous, Super Trouper and The Visitors, as well as their two non-LP singles "The Day Before You Came" and "Under Attack". Following the demise of ABBA, all members of the group continued using the studio to record their solo projects.

In addition to ABBA, a range of other well-known artists recorded at Polar. Among the albums to have been recorded at the studio are Led Zeppelin's In Through the Out Door and Genesis' Duke.

History

The studio was created in 1978 at a disused cinema theatre on the street floor of a building known as Sportpalatset (Palace of Sports) in central Stockholm. The massive edifice, built around 1930, owed its name to a large indoor public bath (closed in the mid-1950s) and several other sports facilities which had been housed upstairs over the years. ABBA had been looking for a modern studio with a good, spacious live sound where they would be able to work at their own leisure and decided that the best solution was to build their own.

Among the early non-ABBA albums recorded at the studio were the Genesis' album Duke (1980), followed by ABBA singer Anni-Frid Lyngstad's solo album Something's Going On (which was produced by Genesis drummer Phil Collins).  Led Zeppelin recorded their 1979 album In Through the Out Door here. Artists such as Big Country, the Ramones, Rammstein, Roxy Music, Genesis, Adam Ant, Backstreet Boys, Beastie Boys, Belinda Carlisle, Burt Bacharach, Franki, Celine Dion, Roxette, Terra Firma, Entombed, The Hellacopters, Joan Armatrading, Agnetha Faltskog and many major Swedish artists worked at Polar Studios.

The centrepiece of the studio was a Harrison mixing console, which was modified by technician Leif Mases to give it a unique sound that in some respects resembled a Neve desk. ABBA's 1981 album The Visitors marked a turning point for Polar, as it was recorded on the studio's new 3M digital recorder - thus becoming one of the first digital mainstream pop records.

The music video for ABBA's 1979 song "Gimme! Gimme! Gimme! (A Man After Midnight)" was filmed in the studio; it depicted the group recording the track, although in reality the audio recording was already complete. On the same day, the group also filmed the Spanish language video for "Estoy Soñando" there.

Ownership history and closure

The studio's original location was a former cinema theatre, in an early 1930s building at Sankt Eriksgatan 58-60 on Kungsholmen. Construction began on the studio in 1977, and it opened for production on May 18, 1978. In 1984, Stig Anderson bought out his partners in the company. Shortly afterwards, he sold the studio to his daughter Marie Ledin, her husband Tomas Ledin, and their business partner Lennart Östlund.

In 2004, the private housing cooperative that owned the building which housed Polar raised the space's yearly rent to $184,000—triple the amount asked of other renters in the building. As a result, the studio was forced to move out. Some time later, the former owners of Polar relocated to a new facility at Kingside Studio. The studio has since then moved several times; the last address was in Hammarby Sjöstad in Stockholm. In the fall of 2015 business was scaled down and equipment was moved to a warehouse.

Legacy

In 2010, ABBA The Museum premiered an exhibit that attempted to recreate the band's Polar Studios setup.

Equipment
Polar's recording facility consisted of two different sections, one that utilized analog tape machines and one that implemented the cutting-edge digital equipment of the day.

Studio A featured a Solid State Logic 4056 mixing console, coupled with any combination of a Studer A-820 24-track, Studer A-827 24-track, or Otari DTR-900 MK II 32-track tape machines. Studio A featured four separate isolated rooms, each with varying acoustics. Polar's Studio B maintained a 48-channel Calrec UA 8000 mixing board paired with a 3M digital 32-track audio recorder. When Polar premiered this setup in 1981, it was one of the first digital studios in the world. Studio B consisted of one "live room" in which musicians performed.

References

 "Abba": The Complete Recording Sessions, Carl Magnus Palm and Dick Wallis, 13 October 1994, Verulam Publishing Ltd,

External links
 Kingside Studios website

ABBA
Recording studios in Sweden